The 1997 United Kingdom general election in Northern Ireland was held on 1 May with 18 MPs elected in single-seat constituencies using first-past-the-post as part of the wider general election in the United Kingdom. This was an increase of one seat in Northern Ireland, where the House of Commons as a whole had increased from 650 to 659 seats.

1,177,969 people were eligible to vote, up 53,069 from the 1992 general election. 67.39% of eligible voters turned out, down 2.6 percentage points from the last general election.

Results
The Labour Party led by Tony Blair won a large majority with 418 of 659 seats, returning to office after 18 years of Conservative Party government. In Northern Ireland, Sinn Féin gained two seats, beginning a steady growth in support in elections to the House of Commons.

Less than a year after this election, on 10 April 1998, the Good Friday Agreement was signed, providing for a Northern Ireland Assembly and devolved government through the Northern Ireland Executive.

MPs elected

By-elections

References

Northern Ireland
1997
1997 elections in Northern Ireland